Sophiane Méthot (born August 3, 1998) is a Canadian trampoline gymnast. In 2017 she won the bronze medal in the women's individual event at the 2017 Trampoline Gymnastics World Championships held in Sofia, Bulgaria.

At the 2019 Trampoline World Championships held in Tokyo, Japan, she won, alongside Samantha Smith, Sarah Milette and Rosie MacLennan, the bronze medal in the women's team event with a score of 133.745.

References

External links 
 

Living people
1998 births
Place of birth missing (living people)
Canadian female trampolinists
Medalists at the Trampoline Gymnastics World Championships